A youth center or youth centre, often called youth club, is a place where young people can meet and participate in a variety of activities, for example table football, association football (US soccer, UK football), basketball, table tennis, video games, occupational therapy and religious activities.  Youth clubs and centres vary in their activities across the globe, and have diverse histories based on shifting cultural, political and social contexts and relative levels of state funding or voluntary action.

Young social groups 
Many youth clubs are set up to provide young people with activities designed to keep them off the streets and out of trouble, and to give them a job and an interest in activity. Some youth clubs can have a particular compelling force, such as music, spiritual/religious guidance and advice or characteristics such as determination.

In the United Kingdom, there are a number of national youth club networks, including:
 UK Youth
 Ambition
 National Association of Boys and Girls Clubs

In the United States, the Boys & Girls Clubs of America is one of the most popular (or well known) youth clubs.

Projects and activities
Many youth clubs and projects are open to all people aged 15–21, although some clubs may still accept young people as old as 25. There are places where young people can meet with friends and practice new activities. Many youth clubs offer various activities, such as table tennis.

Youth clubs are there to help young people understand the world around them. They are there to advise young people with their future, to talk about the past and even help them with the present. Many clubs hold different sessions to educate young people about different topics regarding their health and worries, e.g. contraception. Youth clubs normally have a leader youth worker who normally organizes trips or workshops for the young people to contribute in, e.g. Show Racism the Red Card. They can also hold charity events and even volunteer to do many different things. Youth clubs will sometimes help young people to gain qualifications for their life ahead, e.g. The Duke of Edinburgh's Award.

See also
List of youth organizations
Salford Lads Club
Essex Boys and Girls Clubs
Teen center

References

Youth organizations